Adios... Puta Madres is a live album by Ministry, released on March 31, 2009 on 13th Planet Records. The album was recorded at various locations on Ministry's farewell tour, dubbed the "C U LaTouR". In 2009, "Señor Peligro" was nominated for a Grammy Award in the category of Best Metal Performance for the 52nd Grammy Awards.

Track listing

DVD
The DVD release consists of two discs and contains additional songs and bonus features, including a tour documentary entitled "Fuchi Requiem".

Track listing

Personnel

Ministry
 Al Jourgensen – vocals, guitars, production, mixing
 Sin Quirin – guitars
 Tommy Victor – guitars
 Tony Campos – bass
 John Bechdel – keyboards
 Aaron Rossi – drums

Additional personnel
 Michihiro Tanikawa – mixing, live sound recording
 John Billberry – engineering
 Dave Donnelly – mastering
 Steffan Chirazi – photography
 Bruce Biegler – photography
 Lawton Outlaw – art direction & design

References

2009 live albums
Albums produced by Al Jourgensen
Megaforce Records live albums
Ministry (band) albums